Honey Creek is a stream in Pottawattamie and Harrison counties, Iowa, in the United States. It is a tributary of Missouri River.

Honey Creek was named by settlers for the great number of honeybees seen at the creek.

See also
List of rivers of Iowa

References

Rivers of Harrison County, Iowa
Rivers of Pottawattamie County, Iowa
Rivers of Iowa